Hornby is a small village and civil parish located about  north-west of Bedale.  It is part of the non-metropolitan district of Richmondshire in the shire county of North Yorkshire, England.

Etymology
The name of the village is first attested in the Domesday Book of 1086 as Hornebi and Horneby. It derives from the Old Norse personal name Horni and the word bý ('farm'). Thus the name once meant 'farm belonging to Horni'.

Governance
Hornby is part of the electoral ward of Hornby Castle. This ward stretches north to Brough with St. Giles, with a total population of 1,766.

References

External links

Villages in North Yorkshire
Civil parishes in North Yorkshire